Living Proof is the third studio album from American pop punk band State Champs. It is their last album to feature rhythm guitarist Tony Diaz before his departure in March 2020.

Production
Mike Green and Kyle Black produced "Criminal", "Frozen", "Crystal Ball", "Lightning", "Safe Haven", "The Fix Up", "Cut Through the Static", and "Sidelines". Green and Black were assisted by engineers Colin Schwanke and Will McCoy, both of whom also did Pro Tools editing. John Feldmann produced "Dead and Gone", "Our Time to Go", "Something About You", "Mine Is Gold", and "Time Machine". Zakk Cervini, Jon Lundin, and Matt Pauling served as engineers, and did additional production; Black co-produced "Time Machine", and did additional engineering on "Dead and Gone", "Mine Is Gold", and "Time Machine". Black mixed all of the recordings, with assistance from Austin Linkous, before the album was mastered by Ted Jensen.

Track listing
Track listing per booklet.

Personnel
Personnel per booklet.

State Champs
 Derek DiScanio – lead vocals
 Tyler Szalkowski – guitar
 Ryan Scott Graham – bass
 Tony "Rival" Diaz – guitar
 Evan Ambrosio – drums

Additional musicians
 Henry Lunetta – additional guitar (track 4)
 Mark Hoppus – additional vocals (track 12)

Production
 Mike Green – producer (tracks 1–3, 5, 7, 9, 10 and 13)
 Kyle Black – producer (tracks 1–3, 5, 7, 9, 10 and 13), co-producer (track 12), additional engineering (tracks 4, 11 and 12), mixing
 John Feldmann – producer (tracks 4, 6, 8, 11 and 12)
 Colin Schwanke – assistant engineer (tracks 1–3, 5, 7, 9, 10 and 13), Pro Tools editing (tracks 1–3, 5, 7, 9, 10 and 13)
 Will McCoy – assistant engineer (tracks 1–3, 5, 7, 9, 10 and 13), Pro Tools editing (tracks 1–3, 5, 7, 9, 10 and 13)
 Austin Linkous – mixing assistance
 Zakk Cervini – engineer, additional production
 Jon Lundin – engineer, additional production
 Matt Pauling – engineer, additional production
 Ted Jensen – mastering

Design
 Dewey Saunders – artwork, collage
 Trey Hales – typography
 Ian Rees – layout
 Beth Saravo – photography

Charts

References

2018 albums
State Champs albums
Pure Noise Records albums